Willard Earl Pugh (born June 16, 1959) is an American actor with numerous film and television credits. He has appeared in notable mainstream Hollywood films such as The Color Purple and Air Force One as well as genre films such as RoboCop 2 and Mil Mascaras vs. the Aztec Mummy. In the latter film his excellence as an ensemble actor was specifically cited by PopMatters film critic Bill Gibron.

Pugh taught broadcasting and film classes at Chaffey College for 11 years in Rancho Cucamonga in the early 1990s.

Pugh was born in Memphis, Tennessee, the son of Pearlie (née Harris) and Henry Minor Pugh and graduated from Hamilton High School.

Films 

 1982: Divided We Fall - Runaway Slave
 1984: The Hills Have Eyes Part II - Foster
 1984: Toy Soldiers - Ace
 1985: Moving Violations - Jeff Roth
 1985: Stand Alone - Macombers
 1985: The Color Purple - Harpo Johnson
 1986: Blue City - Leroy
 1986: Native Son - Gus
 1987: Amazon Women on the Moon - Speaking Cop (segment "Video Date")
 1987: Made in Heaven - Guy Blanchard / Brian Dalton
 1988: Traxx - Deeter
 1990: RoboCop 2 - Mayor Kuzak
 1991: Guyver - Col. Castle
 1991: A Rage in Harlem - Claude X
 1991: Ambition - Freddie
 1991: Pretty Hattie's Baby
 1992: Eddie Presley - Nick
 1993: CB4 - Trustus
 1994: Puppet Master 5: The Final Chapter - Jason
 1995: Under the Hula Moon - Duane
 1997: Air Force One - White House Communications Officer
 1998: Spoiler - Bounty #2
 1998: Progeny .... Eric Davidson
 1998: High Freakquency - Dale
 2000: Up Against Amanda - Officer Wharton
 2000: Today's Life - The PR Man
 2001: The Big Leaf Tobacco Company - Mr. Franklin
 2007: Mil Mascaras vs. the Aztec Mummy - Police Chief
 2008: Kings of the Evening - Henry Nicholson
 2008: Loved Ones - Captain Strader
 2012: Making Change - Manager
 2014: McTaggart's Fortune - Sgt. Leonard Forte

References

External links

Mil Mascaras vs. the Aztec Mummy Official Page
PopMatters review of Mil Mascaras vs. the Aztec Mummy

1959 births
Living people
20th-century American male actors
21st-century American male actors
American male film actors
Male actors from Memphis, Tennessee
African-American male actors
American male television actors
20th-century African-American people
21st-century African-American people